Samantha Lam Chi-mei (9 April 1963) is a Hong Kong singer and songwriter. In 1982, the television station RTHK awarded one of her songs, "Feelings of a Passage", later heard from her 1983 self-titled debut album, as one of top ten gold songs of 1981–82.
In 1983, Lam sang a radio hit Cantonese rendition of the well-known Mandarin song "Into Your Eyes", originally sung in 1981 by Tsai Chin, for her debut album.
In 1984–85, another of her songs, "ngau yu", a theme song for the 1984 film A Certain Romance, was awarded as one of top ten gold songs of 1983–84 by RTHK, the seventh place of the Jade Solid Gold Best Ten Music Awards by another station TVB, and the Hong Kong Film Award for the Best Movie Song of 1984.
Lam sang also "ouyu", a Mandarin version of "ngau yu", for the titled 1984 album. Since then, later singers have rendered both versions of "ngau yu" (sometimes with slightly different lyrics), like Sammi Cheng and Zhou Xun.

Discography 
 Samantha Lam, 1983
 What Is Fate? ( saam maw see yuen fan), 1984
 ngau yu, 1984 (Chance Encounter)
 Love Illusion ( ngoi ching waan tzeung), 1985
 Piano in a Rainy Night and Blue Remixes ( yu yeh gong kam, fan laam sik dik jing hsuen), 1986
 You Say Goodbye ( yan nei beet lei), 1987
 sat toot, 1988
 wing yuen dong ting, 1988 (Timeless Pleasures or Forever Soothing)
 When Samantha Meets Chris Babida ( dong Lam Ji Mei yu seung Bau Bei Daat), 2003
 yuen mei tzu yi, 2006
 Moment to Moment, 2009

References

External links 
 Samantha Lam at VinylParadise.com

20th-century Hong Kong women singers
Living people
Place of birth missing (living people)
Hong Kong Christians
21st-century Hong Kong women singers
1963 births